I Love You, Baby is a 2000 German action thriller film directed by Nick Lyon with Jasmin Gerat, Mark Keller, Maximilian Schell and Burkhard Driest in the lead.

Synopsis
The film revolves around two con partners named Peter and Gwen who plan to steal money from the millionaire Walter Ekland by posing Peter as his long lost son and Gwen as Peter's wife who is undergoing treatment for cancer. Their plan gets in jeopardy when a detective named Decker, who knows their identities, decides to get a share of the money.

Cast
 Jasmin Gerat as Gwen
 Mark Keller as Peter 
 Maximilian Schell as Walter Ekland
 Burkhard Driest as Decker
 Katja Burkard as Fernsehsprecherin
 Prince Hughes as Real Decker
 Mario Irrek as Richie Rich
 Wolfram Kons as Fernsehsprecher
 Lorenzo Bassa Mestre as Taxifahrer
 Patrizia Moresco as Maria
 Ralph Morgenstern as Sickenberger
 Peter Rappenglück as Cookie
 Pierre Shrady as Barkeeper
 Carlo Thränhardt as Chauffeur

Reception
I Love You, Baby was met with mixed reviews. Cineclub positively reviewed Nick Lyon's directorial approach. Some appreciated the picturesque locales and the screenplay. However, Schnitt gave it a negative review, calling it as a low grade television movie with numerous wide shots that actually kills the cinema audience.

References

External links

2000 films
German action thriller films
2000 action thriller films
Films directed by Nick Lyon
2000s German films
2000s German-language films